Longjing District is a coastal suburban district in western Taichung, Taiwan.

Geography 
Longjing shares borders with Wuqi and Shalu to the north, Xitun to the east, the Pacific Ocean to the west, Dadu and Shengang in Changhua County to the south. The eastern part of Longjing is located on the Dadu Plateau.

Name and history 
The area was originally occupied by the aboriginal Papora people. The term Longjing (龍井) means "Dragon Well"; a well is located in the area. Prior to Japanese rule, the district was called "Chie Tou Village" (茄投庄). During Japanese rule over Taiwan the district was renamed to Longjing (龍井), taken from the name of a famous well in the area named Dragon Eye Well (龍目井)

Dragon Eye Well is located in Longquan Village, under an old camphor tree. One of the Qing governors of Changhua recorded that the well's water was cool and refreshing, and the atmosphere was serene around the well. The name "Dragon Eye" comes from the two rocks around the well that makes it look like a dragon.

Administrative divisions

Infrastructure 
Longjing houses Taichung Power Plant, the world's largest coal-fired power plant.

Transportation 
The district is served by a variety of national roads.
 National Freeway 3
 Provincial Highway 1
 Provincial Highway 17
 Provincial Highway 61

The district can be reached by rail through TRA Longjing Station.

See also 

 Taichung

References

External links 
  

Districts of Taichung